Mount Robinson is a 12,967-foot-elevation (3,952 meter) mountain summit located in Inyo County, California, United States.

Description
Mount Robinson is set within the John Muir Wilderness, on land managed by Inyo National Forest. It is situated one mile east of the crest of the Sierra Nevada mountain range in the Palisades area, just outside the boundary of Kings Canyon National Park. Mount Robinson ranks as the 156th-highest summit in California, and the seventh-highest peak of the Inconsolable Range. A rock glacier lies below the west slope.

History
The first ascent of the summit was made July 4, 1930, by Norman Clyde, who is credited with 130 first ascents, most of which were in the Sierra Nevada. This landform's toponym was officially adopted by the U.S. Board on Geographic Names to honor Douglas Robinson whose career with the US Forest Service spanned 30 years. In 1933, he authored "Inyo National Forest" which compiled valuable information about the forest. As Chief Ranger, Robinson dispatched volunteers to search for Walter A. Starr Jr.

Climate
According to the Köppen climate classification system, Mount Robinson is located in an alpine climate zone. Most weather fronts originate in the Pacific Ocean, and travel east toward the Sierra Nevada mountains. As fronts approach, they are forced upward by the peaks (orographic lift), causing them to drop their moisture in the form of rain or snowfall onto the range. Precipitation runoff from this mountain drains into headwaters of North Fork Big Pine Creek.

See also
 
 List of the major 4000-meter summits of California

References

External links
 Weather forecast: Mount Robinson

Inyo National Forest
Mountains of Inyo County, California
Mountains of the John Muir Wilderness
North American 3000 m summits
Mountains of Northern California
Sierra Nevada (United States)